The Portfolio Committee on Communications is a portfolio committee of the National Assembly in the Parliament of South Africa. The role of the committee is to oversee the work of the Department of Communications and Digital Technologies and other related public bodies.

Since August 2019, Boyce Maneli of the African National Congress (ANC) has served as the chairperson of the portfolio committee.

Membership
The membership of the committee is as follows:

The following Members of Parliament serve as alternate members:
Nqabayomzi Kwankwa (United Democratic Movement)
Mbuyiseni Ndlozi (Economic Freedom Fighters)
Sheilla Xego (African National Congress)

References

Committees of the National Assembly of South Africa